Coleophora lynosyridella is a moth of the family Coleophoridae. It is found in the United States, including California.

The larvae feed on the leaves of Chrysothamnus (including Chrysothamnus viscidiflorus) and Baccharis species. They create a trivalved, tubular silken case.

References

lynosyridella
Moths described in 1882
Moths of North America